Jefferson P. Casady (September 1, 1823 – April 27, 1898) was a pioneer, judge, lawyer, and state senator in Iowa. Casady and his brothers, including his brother Phineas were members of the influential Casady family of bankers, politicians, landowners, and farmers who had a strong impact on the early history and legislation of Iowa. The Casady family were some of the early settlers of Pottawattamie County.

Early life
Born in Connersville, Indiana, Casady migrated to Iowa in 1852. His family was of Scotch-Irish descent. His father Simon Casady was a farmer, his brother Phineas M. Casady was a politician and judge, and his nephew Simon Casady was a prominent banker. He married Hannah Joiner in 1856, a woman who was born in Ohio in 1839 and moved to Council Bluffs in 1850 with her father Timothy Joiner. Together they had 5 children, but only 3 survived to adulthood: Ida, Thomas, and Albert.

Career
Casady decided to pursue a career in law and was admitted to the bar in Des Moines, Iowa. His specialty was civil law, particularly real estate. Together with James D. Test and Hadley D. Johnson, Casady formed a real estate partnership that was located at the future location of the First National Bank building of Council Bluffs. In addition to his primary business in real estate, Casady also served as a county judge, a member of the Iowa State Senate, and the director of the Council Bluffs & St. Joseph Railroad. A life-long member of the Democratic Party, Casady also held active memberships in the Independent Order of Odd Fellows fraternal order as well as the First Presbyterian Church of Council Bluffs. He wife  Hannah was known for holding church socials at the Casady home. She died of pneumonia on May 6, 1882, at age 44.

Death
Casady died on April 27, 1898, and is buried at Fairview Cemetery in Council Bluffs, Iowa.

References

External links

1828 births
1892 deaths
19th-century American judges
19th-century American politicians
American lawyers
American notaries
American people of Scotch-Irish descent
American Presbyterians
Businesspeople from Des Moines, Iowa
Casady family
Iowa state court judges
Democratic Party Iowa state senators
People from Council Bluffs, Iowa
Politicians from Des Moines, Iowa
19th-century American businesspeople